Kledis Hereki  (born 27 September 1995) is an Albanian footballer who plays for Mandraikos as a left back.

References

External links
 

1995 births
Living people
Association football fullbacks
Albanian footballers
AEK Athens F.C. players
A.O. Nea Ionia F.C. players
Albanian expatriate footballers
Expatriate footballers in Greece
Albanian expatriate sportspeople in Greece